The Apatophyseini are  a tribe  of longhorn beetles in the subfamily Dorcasominae, erected by Lacordaire in 1869.

Genera

The following are included in BioLib.cz:

 Aedoeus Waterhouse, 1880
 Afroartelida Vives & Adlbauer, 2005
 Afroccrisis Vives, 2009
 Agastophysis Miroshnikov, 2014
 Alleculaedoeus Villiers, Quentin & Vives, 2011
 Analogisticus Miroshnikov, 2014
 Andringitrina Villiers, Quentin & Vives, 2011
 Ankirihitra Villiers, Quentin & Vives, 2011
 Anosibella Villiers, Quentin & Vives, 2011
 Anthribola Bates, 1879
 Antigenes funebris Pascoe, 1888 (monotypic genus)
 Apatobatus Vives & Heffern, 2012
 Apatophysis Chevrolat, 1860
 Apheledes Fairmaire, 1893
 Appedesis Waterhouse, 1880
 Apterotoxitiades Adlbauer, 2008
 Ariastes Fairmaire, 1896
 Artelida Thomson, 1864
 Barossus Fairmaire, 1893
 Bejofanus Villiers, Quentin & Vives, 2011
 Boppeus Villiers, 1982
 Borneophysis Vives & Heffern, 2006
 Brachymyiodola Villiers, Quentin & Vives, 2011
 Capetoxotus Tippmann, 1959
 Catalanotoxotus Vives, 2005
 Cribraedoeus Villiers, Quentin & Vives, 2011
 Criocerinus Fairmaire, 1894
 Dalitera Villiers, Quentin & Vives, 2011
 Dinopteroides Villiers, Quentin & Vives, 2011
 Dorcianus Fairmaire, 1901
 Dotoramades Villiers, 1982
 Dysmathosoma Waterhouse, 1882
 Eccrisis Pascoe, 1888
 Echaristha Fairmaire, 1901
 Enthymius Waterhouse, 1878
 Eupalelius Fairmaire, 1896
 †Eurapatophysis Vitali, 2016
 Formosotoxotus Hayashi, 1960
 Gaurotinus Fairmaire, 1897
 Harimius Fairmaire, 1889
 Heteraedoeus Villiers, Quentin & Vives, 2011
 Hukaruana Villiers, Quentin & Vives, 2011
 Hypogenes Villiers, Quentin & Vives, 2011
 Icariotis Pascoe, 1888
 Kudekanye Rice, 2008
 Leonaedoeus Villiers, Quentin & Vives, 2011
 Lepturasta Fairmaire, 1901
 Lepturomyia Quentin, 2000
 Lepturovespa Villiers, Quentin & Vives, 2011
 Lingoria Fairmaire, 1901
 Logisticus Waterhouse, 1878
 Malagassycarilia Villiers, Quentin & Vives, 2011
 Mastododera Thomson, 1857
 Megasticus Vives, 2004
 Mimapatophysis Miroshnikov, 2014
 Molorchineus Villiers, Quentin & Vives, 2011
 Musius Fairmaire, 1889
 Omodylia Villiers, Quentin & Vives, 2011
 Otteissa Pascoe, 1864
 Pachysticus Fairmaire, 1889
 Pachyticon Thomson, 1857
 Parakimerus Villiers, Quentin & Vives, 2011
 Paralogisticus Vives, 2006
 Paratophysis Gressitt & Rondon, 1970
 Pareccrisis Villiers, Quentin & Vives, 2011
 Parecharista Villiers, Quentin & Vives, 2011
 Paulianacmaeops Villiers, Quentin & Vives, 2011
 Phitryonus Fairmaire, 1903
 Phyllotodes Adlbauer, 2001
 Planisticus Vives, 2004
 Protapatophysis Semenov-Tian-Shanskij & Stschegoleva-Barovskaia, 1936
 Pseudogenes (beetle) Fairmaire, 1894
 Pseudomusius Villiers, Quentin & Vives, 2011
 Pyllotodes Adlbauer, 2001
 Raharizonina Villiers, 1982
 Ramodatodes Villiers, 1982
 Sagridola Fairmaire, 1893
 Scariates Fairmaire, 1894
 Scopanta Fairmaire, 1893
 Sitiorica Villiers, Quentin & Vives, 2011
 Soalalana Villiers, Quentin & Vives, 2011
 Stenotsivoka Adlbauer, 2001
 Stenoxotus Fairmaire, 1896
 Strophophysis Miroshnikov, 2014
 Suzelia Villiers, 1982
 Tomobrachyta Fairmaire, 1887
 Toxitiades Fairmaire, 1893
 Trichartelida Villiers, Quentin & Vives, 2011
 Trichroa Fairmaire, 1894
 Tsivoka Villiers, 1982
 Urasomus Adlbauer, 2012
 Vadonitoxotus Villiers, Quentin & Vives, 2011
 Villiersicus Vives, 2005
 Viossatus Villiers, Quentin & Vives, 2011
 Xanthopiodus Fairmaire, 1897
 Zulphis Fairmaire, 1893
 Zulphisoma Villiers, Quentin & Vives, 2011

References

External links
 
 

Dorcasominae
Beetle tribes